Křídla vlasti Olomouc was a Czechoslovak football club from the town of Olomouc, which played two seasons in the Czechoslovak First League. It was founded in 1951 before changing its name in 1956 to Dukla Olomouc. The club's last top-flight season was the 1954 Czechoslovak First League, finishing in 11th position among 12 teams. The club ceased to exist in 1975.

Historical names 
 1952 – Křídla vlasti Olomouc
 1956 – Dukla Olomouc

References

 
Football clubs in Czechoslovakia
Czechoslovak First League clubs
Association football clubs established in 1952
Association football clubs disestablished in 1975
Defunct football clubs in the Czech Republic